Hans Nylund (8 June 1939 – 3 September 2017) was a Norwegian footballer. He played in one match for the Norway national football team in 1958.

References

External links
 

1939 births
2017 deaths
Norwegian footballers
Norway international footballers
Place of birth missing
Association footballers not categorized by position